Tragiscoschema nigroscriptum is a species of beetle in the family Cerambycidae. It was described by Léon Fairmaire in 1897.

Its type locality is Tabora, Tanzania.

It is a minor pest of the cotton plant in Tanzania.

References

Tragocephalini
Beetles described in 1897
Taxa named by Léon Fairmaire
Insects of Tanzania